The Homocioaia is a left tributary of the river Slănic in Romania. It discharges into the Slănic in Gura Dimienii.

References

Rivers of Romania
Rivers of Buzău County